Chicas Al Poder is an album by Bellepop, released in 2002.

Track listing

Special Edition

On May 13, 2003 a Special Edition of Chicas Al Poder was released in Spain.

Track listing
 "Chicas al poder" (Spanish version of "I've Got My Eyes On You" by Jessica Simpson)
 "Esta noche mando yo (New Mix)"
 "La vida que va"
 "Paraíso"
 "Mi amor será para siempre"
 "La fuerza de tu amor"
 "Si pides más (Radio Edit)"
 "Sólo es amor"
 "Mi corazón"
 "No me pidas amor"
 "Si tú me llamas"
 "Si pides más (Latin House Extended)"
 "Chicas al poder (Versión Acústica)"
 "Si pides más (Dub Remix)"
 "Si pides más (Latin House Single)"

DVD
 "Videoclip Chicas al poder" 
 "Videoclip La vida que va" 
 "Videoclip Si pides más" 
 "Making of Chicas al poder" 
 "Diario secreto de Bellepop"

2002 albums
Bellepop albums